Shigeru Kasahara (Japanese: 笠原 茂, June 11, 1933 - 1990) was a retired Japanese lightweight freestyle wrestler. He won a gold medal at the 1954 Asian Games and a silver at the 1956 Summer Olympics.

References

External links
 

1933 births
1990 deaths
Olympic wrestlers of Japan
Wrestlers at the 1956 Summer Olympics
Japanese male sport wrestlers
Olympic silver medalists for Japan
Olympic medalists in wrestling
Asian Games medalists in wrestling
Wrestlers at the 1954 Asian Games
Medalists at the 1956 Summer Olympics
Medalists at the 1954 Asian Games
Asian Games gold medalists for Japan
20th-century Japanese people